When You Love Someone may refer to:

"When You Love Someone" (Jake Owen song), from the 2016 album American Love
"When You Love Someone" (James TW song), from the 2016 EP First Impressions
"When You Love Someone" (Sammy Kershaw song), from the 1999 album Maybe Not Tonight
"When You Love Someone", a song by Bryan Adams, originally released on the 1997 album Unplugged

See also
Love Someone (disambiguation)
"When You Love Someone Like That", a song by Reba McEntire from the 2007 album Reba: Duets 
"If You Love Someone", a song by The Veronicas' from the same-named 2014 album